Krishan Lal Kaila (1932–2003) was an Indian geophysicist and seismologist. Born in Lahore of the British India (presently in Pakistan) on 7 September 1932, he was known for his studies on deep seismic soundings (DSS) and was one of the pioneers of the DSS technique in India. His studies covered the tectonic regions of Kadapa, Dharwar Craton, Deccan Traps, and the sedimentary basins of Gujarat and the Himalayas and added to the understanding of the geophysics of the region. His researches have been documented as several peer-reviewed articles; ResearchGate, an online article repository has listed 117 of them. Several authors have cited his works in their work.

Awards 
He received the Krishnan Medal and the Decennial Award of the Indian Geophysical Union in 1976 and 1994 respectively. The Council of Scientific and Industrial Research, the apex agency of the Government of India for scientific research, awarded him the Shanti Swarup Bhatnagar Prize for Science and Technology, one of the highest Indian science awards for his contributions to Earth, Atmosphere, Ocean and Planetary Sciences in 1977. He died in New Delhi in 2003, at the age of 71.

Selected bibliography

Notes

References

External links 
 

Recipients of the Shanti Swarup Bhatnagar Award in Earth, Atmosphere, Ocean & Planetary Sciences
1932 births
Indian scientific authors
2003 deaths
20th-century Indian geologists
Indian seismologists
Indian geophysicists
Scientists from Lahore